The 2019–20 season is the 49th season in CFR Cluj's history, and the 24th in the top-flight of Romanian football. CFR Cluj is competing in Liga I, in the Cupa României and in the Champions League.

Players

First-team squad

Transfers

In

Loans in

Out

Loans out

Overall transfer activity

Expenditure
Summer:  €1,100,000

Winter:  €210,000

Total:  €1,310,000

Income
Summer:  €200,000

Winter:  €000,000

Total:  €200,000

Net Totals
Summer:  €900,000

Winter:  €210,000

Total:  €1,110,000

Preseason and friendlies

Competitions

Overview

Liga I

The Liga I fixture list was announced in July 2019.

Regular season

Table

Results summary

Results by round

Matches

Championship round

Table

Results summary

Position by round

Matches

Cupa României

CFR Cluj will enter the Cupa României at the Round of 32.

Round of 32

Supercupa României

CFR Cluj will play in the Romanian Supercup as winners of the Liga I against Cupa României winners Viitorul Constanța.

UEFA Champions League

As winners of the 2018-19 Liga I, CFR Cluj entered the Champions League at the first qualifying round.

First qualifying round
The draw for the first round took place on 18 June. CFR Cluj was drawn to play against Kazakh champions Astana.

Second qualifying round
CFR Cluj advanced to the second qualifying round. The draw for the second round took place on 19 June. CFR Cluj was drawn to play against Israeli champions Maccabi Tel Aviv.

Third qualifying round
CFR Cluj advanced to the third qualifying round. The draw for the third round took place on 22 July. CFR Cluj was drawn to play against Scottish champions Celtic.

Play-off Round
CFR Cluj advanced to the play-off round. The draw for the play-off round took place on 5 August. CFR Cluj was drawn to play against Czech champions Slavia Prague.

UEFA Europa League

After losing to Slavia Prague in the Champions League play-off round, CFR Cluj progressed to the Europa League group stage. The draw was held on 30 August. CFR Cluj was drawn with Lazio, Celtic and Rennes.

Group stage

Round of 32
CFR Cluj advanced to the round of 32. The draw for the round of 32 took place on 16 December. CFR Cluj was drawn to play against the Spanish record-winner of the UEFA Europa League Sevilla.

Statistics

Appearances and goals

|-
|colspan="18"|Players who appeared for CFR Cluj that left during the season:
|-

|}

Squad statistics
{|class="wikitable" style="text-align: center;"
|-
!
! style="width:70px;"|Liga I
! style="width:70px;"|Cupa României
! style="width:70px;"|UEFA Champions League
! style="width:70px;"|UEFA Europa League
! style="width:70px;"|Home
! style="width:70px;"|Away
! style="width:70px;"|Total Stats
|-
|align=left|Games played       || 36 || 1 || 8 || 8 || 27 || 26 || 53
|-
|align=left|Games won          || 22 || 0 || 3 || 4 || 20 || 9 || 29
|-
|align=left|Games drawn        || 9 || 1 || 2 || 2 || 5 || 9 || 14
|-
|align=left|Games lost         || 5 || 0 || 3 || 2 || 2 || 8 || 10
|-
|align=left|Goals scored       || 68 || 2 || 11 || 7 || 49 || 39 || 88
|-
|align=left|Goals conceded     || 33 || 2 || 10 || 5 || 11 || 29 || 40
|-
|align=left|Goal difference    || 45 || 0 || 1 || 2 || 38 || 10 || 48
|-
|align=left|Clean sheets       || 22 || 0 || 1 || 4 || 17 || 10 || 27
|-
|align=left|Goal by Substitute || 0 || 0 || 0 || 0 || 0 || 0 || 0
|-
|align=left|Total shots        || – || – || – || – || – || – || –
|-
|align=left|Shots on target    || – || – || – || – || – || – || –
|-
|align=left|Corners            || – || – || – || – || – || – || –
|-
|align=left|Players used       || – || – || – || – || – || – || –
|-
|align=left|Offsides           || – || – || – || – || – || – || –
|-
|align=left|Fouls suffered     || – || – || – || – || – || – || –
|-
|align=left|Fouls committed    || – || – || – || – || – || – || –
|-
|align=left|Yellow cards       || 0 || 0 || 0 || 0 || 0 || 0 || 0
|-
|align=left|Red cards          || 0 || 0 || 0 || 0 || 0 || 0 || 0
|-
|align=left| Winning rate      || 0% || 0% || 0% || 0% || 0% || 0% || 0%
|-

Goalscorers

Goal minutes

Last updated: 3 August 2020 
Source: Soccerway

Hat-tricks

Clean sheets

Disciplinary record

Attendances

See also
 2019–20 Cupa României
 2019–20 Liga I

References

CFR Cluj seasons
CFR, Cluj
Romanian football championship-winning seasons